Convention Center is a St. Louis MetroLink subway station.  It is one of three stations to have an escalator system, with the other two being 8th & Pine and Lambert Airport Terminal 1. This station is located in downtown St. Louis and primarily serves the Dome and convention facilities at America's Center, the Marriott St. Louis Grand Hotel, and the Washington Avenue Loft District.

The station was built within the historic St. Louis Freight Tunnel that originally opened in 1874.  Built to carry train traffic between the Eads Bridge and the Mill Creek Valley rail yards, it saw its last train (Amtrak) in 1974.  Renovation of the tunnels began in 1991 to prepare them for the opening of MetroLink in 1993.  In 1992, just east of this station, a portion of the tunnel beneath Washington Avenue and Broadway collapsed, injuring no one.

In 1997, Metro's Arts in Transit program commissioned the work Birds in Flight by artists Peter Tao, Helen Lee, and Stuart and Stacey Morse for installation in the tunnel between the Convention Center and Laclede's Landing stations.  The painted panels are meant to mimic the motion of a flying bird.

On January 20, 2023, Metro Transit announced that Convention Center would undergo a full rehabilitation. These improvements include updating elevator, escalator and stair access, lighting upgrades, improved signage and way-finding, a deep cleaning, and general infrastructure upgrades like new walls and flooring.

Station layout
The station's westbound platform is accessed via an entrance in the base of the former Stix, Baer, and Fuller flagship department store building, now known as The Laurel. The westbound side can also be accessed via a set of subway stairs on the northeast corner of 6th Street and Washington Avenue. The eastbound platform is accessed via a set of subway stairs, an escalator, and an elevator in the public plaza of 600 Washington in addition to another set of subway stairs across 6th Street.

References

External links
 St. Louis Metro
North 6th Street entrance from Google Maps Street View

MetroLink stations in St. Louis
Railway stations in the United States opened in 1993
Red Line (St. Louis MetroLink)
Blue Line (St. Louis MetroLink)
Railway stations located underground in Missouri
1993 establishments in Missouri